Alastair Oliver Scott (born 18 September 1965) is a New Zealand politician who was elected to the New Zealand parliament at the 2014 general election as a representative of the New Zealand National Party.

Private life and business interests
Scott grew up in Auckland and Wellington attending Wellington College and then Massey University in Palmerston North. He is the owner of the Matahiwi Estate winery.

Scott and his partner Robyn Noble-Campbell share their time between homes in the Wellington suburb of Kelburn (their primary home) and Masterton. Both of them have three children each.

Political career

Scott defeated Jo Hayes to win the National Party's selection for the  electorate at the 2014 election. The late entry of Carterton mayor and former MP Ron Mark for New Zealand First turned the 2014 election into a "three-horse race" with Labour's Kieran McAnulty and Scott. In the end, Scott had a clear majority over McAnulty, with Mark slightly behind in third place. He won the Wairarapa seat again in the 2017 New Zealand general election with a reduced majority, and placed 46th on the party list.

On 25 June 2019, Scott announced that he would not contest the 2020 general election.

References

Living people
1965 births
New Zealand National Party MPs
Members of the New Zealand House of Representatives
New Zealand MPs for North Island electorates
21st-century New Zealand politicians
Candidates in the 2017 New Zealand general election